Craspedosis is a genus of moths in the family Geometridae.

Species
 Craspedosis arycandata (Walker, 1862)
 Craspedosis atramentaria (Warren, 1894)
 Craspedosis cyanoxantha (Meyrick, 1889)
 Craspedosis leucosticta Warren, 1896
 Craspedosis melanura (Kirsch, 1877)
 Craspedosis simulans Butler
 Craspedosis sobria (Walker, [1865])
 Craspedosis timor (Walker, [1865])
 Craspedosis tricolor Felder
 Craspedosis undulosa Warren, 1894

References
 Craspedosis at Markku Savela's Lepidoptera and Some Other Life Forms
 Natural History Museum Lepidoptera genus database

Boarmiini